Romaschenko (Russian or Ukrainian: Ромащенко, Belarusian: Рамашчанка) is a gender-neutral Slavic surname originating from the given name Roman. The surname may refer to

 Maksim Romaschenko (born 1976), Belarusian football player
 Miroslav Romaschenko (born 1973), Belarusian football player, brother of Maksim

References

Ukrainian-language surnames
Belarusian-language surnames
Russian-language surnames